The Platinum Collection is the first music video compilation by Canadian singer Shania Twain. It was released on  November 6, 2001 by Mercury Nashville Records. The video consists of the music videos from Twain's first three studio albums, Shania Twain (1993), The Woman in Me (1995) and Come on Over (1997), with the exception of "When" (1998), which was released exclusively to the United Kingdom. In 2004, the video was certified platinum by the RIAA for shipments of over 100,000 copies in the United States.

Track listing

Certifications and sales

References

Shania Twain video albums
2001 video albums
2001 compilation albums
Music video compilation albums